Clarence Ray Allen (January 16, 1930 – January 17, 2006) was an American criminal and proxy killer who was executed in 2006 at the age of 76 by lethal injection at San Quentin State Prison in California for the murders of three people. Allen was the second-oldest inmate at the time to be executed in the United States since 1976.

Allen was already serving a life sentence for one murder when he was convicted of organizing the killing of three more people from prison, including a witness who had testified against him.

His lawyers declared that "he presents absolutely no danger at this point, as incapacitated as he is. There's no legitimate state purpose served by executing him. It would be gratuitous punishment." They argued that his execution would constitute cruel and unusual punishment and requested that he be granted clemency by California Governor Arnold Schwarzenegger, which was refused.

Early life 
Clarence Ray Allen was born in 1930 in Blair in southwest Oklahoma. He claimed to be of Choctaw heritage.

At 17, he married Helen Sevier, whom he had met a year earlier while working in the fields.

Fran's Market burglary and murder of Mary Sue Kitts
In 1974, Allen plotted the burglary of Fran's Market, a Fresno-area supermarket owned by Ray and Fran Schletewitz, whom Allen had known for years. The plot involved his son, Roger Allen, as well as Ed Savala, Carl Mayfield, and Charles Jones. Mayfield and Jones worked for Allen in his security guard business as well as part of a burglary enterprise allegedly operated by Allen.

Allen arranged for someone to steal a set of door and alarm keys from the market owner's son, Bryon Schletewitz, while Schletewitz was swimming in Allen's pool. Allen then arranged a date between Schletewitz and Mary Sue Kitts (his son Roger's 17-year-old girlfriend) for the evening, during which time the burglary took place. The burglary netted $500 in cash and $10,000 in money orders from the store's safe.

Following the commission of the burglary, Kitts told Bryon Schletewitz that Allen had committed the crime, which she knew as she had helped Allen cash money orders that had been stolen from the store.

Schletewitz confronted Roger Allen and informed him that he had been told of the crime by Kitts. Roger Allen told his father, Clarence, who said that Schletewitz and Kitts would have to be "dealt with." He enlisted three employees of his security firm, Charles Jones, Carl Mayfield and Eugene "Lee" Furrow. According to an opinion filed on May 6, 2004, in the Ninth Circuit Court of Appeals:

Allen called a meeting at his house and told Jones, Mayfield, and Furrow that Kitts had been talking too much and should be killed. Allen called for a vote on the issue of Kitts's execution. The vote was unanimous because those present feared what would happen if they did not go along with Allen's plan. Allen had previously told his criminal accomplices that he would kill snitches and that he had friends and connections to do the job for him even if he were in prison. He had also referred to himself as a Mafia hitman and stated that the "secret witness program" was useless because a good lawyer could always discover an informant's name and address. Allen kept a newspaper article about the murder of a man and woman in Nevada, and claimed he had "blown them in half" with a shotgun.

Allen ordered Lee Furrow to murder Kitts. After an unsuccessful attempt to poison her with cyanide capsules, Allen called Furrow to learn if he had killed Kitts. Furrow told Allen he was in the process of strangling her and Allen replied, "do it." After killing Kitts, Furrow threw her body into the Friant-Kern Canal. The body has never been found.

Years later, Furrow was arrested and confessed to the murder, implicating Allen. Allen was tried for first-degree murder, convicted and received a life sentence. Furrow, who said Clarence threatened to kill him as well if he didn't murder Mary, pleaded guilty to a reduced charge of second-degree murder.

Execution at Fran's Market
Allen conspired with fellow inmate Billy Ray Hamilton while in Folsom Prison to murder the various witnesses who had testified against him, including Bryon Schletewitz. Allen intended to obtain a new trial, where there would be no witnesses to testify to his acts. After Hamilton was paroled from Folsom Prison, he carried out Allen's orders.

On September 5, 1980, Hamilton and his girlfriend, Connie Barbo, went to Fran's Market while Bryon Schletewitz, who testified against Allen, was working. There, Hamilton murdered Schletewitz and fellow employees Josephine Rocha, 17, and Douglas White, 18, with a sawed-off shotgun and wounded two other people, Joe Rios and Jack Abbott.

Rios raised his arm as Hamilton fired on him and this action undoubtedly saved his life. The other wounded survivor, Abbott, was a neighbor who heard the shotgun blasts, came to the market to investigate, and was also shot by Hamilton. Abbott returned fire and wounded Hamilton, who escaped from the scene.

Five days after the events at Fran's Market, Hamilton was arrested while attempting to rob a liquor store. On his person was found a "hit list" with the names and addresses of the witnesses who testified against Allen at his trial for Kitts' murder; Bryon Schletewitz was on the list.

A jury convicted Hamilton of three counts of murder, one count of attempted robbery and two counts of assault with a deadly weapon. As special circumstances making Hamilton eligible for the death penalty, the jury found that Hamilton had committed murder-robbery, and multiple murders predicated on the killing of other victims. The jury returned a unanimous verdict of death, and the Contra Costa County Superior Court sentenced Hamilton on March 2, 1981.

Second murder trial and death sentence
In 1980, the California Attorney General filed charges against Allen and prosecuted the trial in Glenn County, California, due to a change of venue. The trial took place in 1982 and lasted 23 days, and 58 witnesses were called to testify.<ref>Allen v. Woodford, 395 F.3d 979, 989-990</ref> Ultimately, the jury convicted Allen of triple murder and conspiracy to murder eight witnesses.

As special circumstances making Allen eligible for the death penalty, the jury also found that Allen had previously been convicted of murder, had committed multiple murders, and had murdered witnesses in retaliation for their prior testimony and to prevent future testimony. During a seven-day penalty phase, the Attorney General introduced evidence of Allen's career orchestrating violent robberies in the Central Valley, including ten violent crimes and six prior felony convictions. Allen was convicted of three counts of first-degree murder with special circumstances and was received onto California’s death row at San Quentin State Prison on December 2, 1982.

Suspicions of involvement in 1983 Chino Hills murders
In 1983, Douglas and Peggy Ryen, their 10-year-old daughter and an 11-year-old neighbor were all murdered in an attack in Chino Hills. Clarence Allen previously had a disagreement with the family over a horse he had purchased from them. Kevin Cooper was convicted of the murders, but a girlfriend of Eugene "Lee" Furrow, convicted of murder in the Kitts case and on parole at the time of the attacks, claimed Furrow had been the killer. Furrow denied involvement and provided a DNA sample
In 2018, outgoing California Governor Brown ordered new DNA testing in the Cooper case. Results from DNA testing were still pending as of 2020.

Appeals
In 1987, the California Supreme Court affirmed Allen's death sentence. Associate Justice Joseph Grodin's opinion referred to Allen's crimes as "sordid events" with an "extraordinarily massive amount" of aggravating evidence. In a dissenting opinion, California Supreme Court Justice Broussard stated that the prosecutor influenced the jury by telling them that "if you conclude that aggravating evidence outweighs the mitigating evidence, you shall return a death sentence," while the law does not mandate a death sentence in such a situation. According to Justice Broussard, this led to a lack of freedom for the jury to make a "normative decision."

In 2005, the U.S. Ninth Circuit Court of Appeals found that Allen's trial counsel had been inadequate, and the evidence against him was largely the testimony of Allen's several accomplices, who painted him as the mastermind who forced them by threats and scare tactics to commit robberies and murders. However the court denied rehearing in Allen's case. In her opinion for the panel, Judge Kim McLane Wardlaw concluded:

 Evidence of Allen's guilt is overwhelming. Given the nature of his crimes, sentencing him to another life term would achieve none of the traditional purposes underlying punishment. Allen continues to pose a threat to society, indeed to those very persons who testified against him in the Fran's Market triple-murder trial here at issue, and has proven that he is beyond rehabilitation. He has shown himself more than capable of arranging murders from behind bars. If the death penalty is to serve any purpose at all, it is to prevent the very sort of murderous conduct for which Allen was convicted.

Deputy California Attorney General Ward Campbell stated in an interview:
 Well, Mr. Allen has cited his age, the length of time on death row, claims about innocence, errors at his trial. We found and told the governor we found all those reasons to be unpersuasive given the nature of his crime, which was in fact a direct attack on the criminal justice system perpetrated by a man whom Society thought to be safe from. They thought they were safe from him because he was behind bars and yet he continued to perpetrate these types of crimes and none of the factors that they cite now overshadow or outbalance those reasons for now executing the judgment of the people of the state of California.

On January 13, 2006, California Governor Arnold Schwarzenegger refused to grant Allen clemency, stating that "his conduct did not result from youth or inexperience, but instead resulted from the hardened and calculating decisions of a mature man." Schwarzenegger also cited a poem in which Allen glorified his actions, where Allen wrote, "We rob and steal and for those who squeal are usually found dying or dead."

On January 15, 2006, the Ninth Circuit Court of Appeals denied Allen's claim that executing an aged or infirm person was cruel and unusual punishment, observing that his mental acuity was unimpaired and that he had been fifty years of age when he arranged the murders from prison. Judge Kim Wardlaw writing for the panel of judges Susan Graber, Richard Clifton, and herself: 
 His age and experience only sharpened his ability to coldly calculate the execution of the crime. Nothing about his current ailments reduces his culpability and thus they do not lessen the retributive or deterrent purposes of the death penalty.

The United States Supreme Court declined to hear the case, albeit over the dissent of Justice Stephen Breyer, who stated: "I believe that in the circumstances he raises a significant question as to whether his execution would constitute 'cruel and unusual punishment.'"

Correctional officers familiar with Allen later stated that while he was on death row, he often walked without assistance and alleged that he was not blind, as he was able to read his mail.

Execution
Allen was executed by lethal injection on January 17, 2006, the day after his 76th birthday, at California's San Quentin State Prison. He became the second-oldest inmate to be executed in the United States since 1976 (John B. Nixon of Mississippi was executed in 2005 at age 77). He was the most recently executed inmate in California as of March 2019 when the imposition of the death penalty was suspended in the state by Governor Gavin Newsom.

Allen was assisted in the death chamber by four correctional officers, though a media observer stated that he was clearly moving under his own power. To the surprise of everyone present, the warden indicated that he needed an additional injection of the lethal potassium in order to stop his surprisingly healthy heart. Allen wrote in his final statement, which Warden Steven Ornoski read immediately following the execution, "My last words will be '''Hoka Hey, it's a good day to die.' Thank you very much. I love you all. Goodbye."

Allen died with an eagle feather on his chest. He was wearing a medicine bag around his neck, and a beaded headband. He was visited shortly before the execution by two Native American spiritual advisers.

Allen died at 12:38 a.m. Approximately 250 death penalty opponents gathered for a candlelight vigil outside the walls of San Quentin. His last meal consisted of Buffalo steak and frybread (both are traditional Native American dishes) as well as a bucket of KFC white-meat-only chicken, sugar-free pecan pie, sugar-free walnut ice cream, and whole milk.

Other information
While in the Fresno County Jail on June 27, 1981, Allen called a “death penalty” vote for an inmate and directed an attack in which inmates scalded the target inmate with two gallons of hot water, tied him to the cell bars and beat him, shot him with a zip gun, a type of improvised firearm, and threw razor blades and excrement at him.

See also

 Capital punishment debate
 Capital punishment in California
 Capital punishment in the United States
 John David Duty
 Kevin Cooper (prisoner)
 List of most recent executions by jurisdiction
 List of people executed in California
 List of people executed in the United States in 2006

Notes

References
 San Francisco Chronicle After Williams, a new dilemma for governor Next: Gravely ill and blind man, 75, scheduled to die Jim Doyle December 14, 2005
 Office of the Governor Press release: Governor Schwarzenegger Denies Clemency to Convicted Murderer Clarence Ray Allen January 13, 2006
 FindLaw ALLEN v. WOODFORD - Clarence Ray ALLEN, Petitioner-Appellant, v. Jeanne S. WOODFORD, Warden, of the California State Prison at San Quentin, Respondent-Appellee. January 24, 2005
 California Department of Justice "People v. Clarence Ray Allen"

External links
 The People v. Clarence Ray Allen (42 C3d 1222) – California Supreme Court (Dec. 31, 1986)
 Clarence Allen at The Malefactor's Register
 Clarence Ray Allen at the Clark County, Indiana Prosecutor's Office
 California Department of Justice "People v. Clarence Ray Allen" January 1, 2006

1930 births
2006 deaths
People from Jackson County, Oklahoma
1974 murders in the United States
1980 murders in the United States
American people executed for murder
American people of Choctaw descent
Criminals from California
21st-century executions by California
People executed by California by lethal injection
People convicted of murder by California
21st-century executions of American people
Murder convictions without a body